Dolichoderus rufotibialis is a species of ant in the genus Dolichoderus. Described by John S. Clark in 1930, the species is endemic to Australia.

References

Dolichoderus
Hymenoptera of Australia
Insects described in 1930